Thomas Holdsworth Blake (June 14, 1792 – November 28, 1849) was an American politician who served as a United States Representative from Indiana from 1827 to 1829.

Born in Calvert County, Maryland, Blake attended the public schools, and studied law in Washington, D.C.; during his time in Washington, he served as a member of the militia of the District of Columbia which took part in the Battle of Bladensburg in 1814, during the War of 1812. He later moved to Kentucky and then Indiana. He was admitted to the bar and commenced practice in Terre Haute, Indiana; he served as prosecuting attorney and judge of the circuit court, serving as the US Attorney for the District of Indiana from 1817 to 1818. He was also a businessman who served in the Indiana House of Representatives.

Blake was elected as a Democratic-Republican to the 20th United States Congress, sitting from March 4, 1827 to March 3, 1829; he was an unsuccessful candidate for reelection in 1828 to the Twenty-first Congress. On May 19, 1842, President Tyler appointed him as Commissioner of the General Land Office; he served until April 1845.

In later years, he was a resident trustee of the Wabash & Erie Canal, and he also visited England as a financial agent of the state of Indiana. While returning from that trip, he died in Cincinnati, Ohio, on November 28, 1849, and was interred in Woodlawn Cemetery, in Terre Haute.

Notes

References

External links

1792 births
1849 deaths
Members of the United States House of Representatives from Indiana
People from Calvert County, Maryland
People from Indiana in the War of 1812
Indiana Democratic-Republicans
Indiana National Republicans
19th-century American politicians
General Land Office Commissioners
National Republican Party members of the United States House of Representatives
United States Attorneys for the District of Indiana